Pultenaea prostrata, commonly known as silky bush-pea, is a species of flowering plant in the family Fabaceae and is endemic to south-eastern Australia. It is a small, rigid, wiry, low-lying or prostrate shrub with cylindrical leaves, and yellow, red and purple-brown flowers.

Description
Flowering occurs from September to November and the fruit is an egg-shaped pod.

Taxonomy
Pultenaea prostrata was formally described in 1856 by Joseph Dalton Hooker in The Botany of the Antarctic voyage of H.M. Discovery ships Erebus and Terror. III. Flora Tasmaniae, based on an unpublished description by George Bentham.

Distribution and habitat
Silky bush-pea grows in dry forest and in scattered locations in western and central areas of Victoria, in south-eastern South Australia and in the northern and southern midlands of Tasmania.

Conservation status
This species of pea is relatively common in Victoria and South Australia but is listed as "vulnerable" in Tasmania under the Tasmanian Government Threatened Species Protection Act.

References

prostrata
Fabales of Australia
Flora of South Australia
Flora of Tasmania
Flora of Victoria (Australia)
Plants described in 1856
Taxa named by Joseph Dalton Hooker